Holy Rosary–Danish Church Historic District, also known as Fletcher Place II, is a national historic district located at Indianapolis, Indiana.  The district encompasses 183 contributing buildings in a predominantly residential section located in the central business district of Indianapolis. It was developed between about 1875 and 1930, and include representative examples of Italianate, Gothic Revival, Tudor Revival, and Renaissance Revival style architecture. Located in the district is the separately listed Horace Mann Public School No. 13.  Other notable buildings include the John Kring House (c. 1872), Trinity Danish Evangelical Lutheran Church (1872), John Wands House (1857), Henry Homburg House (c. 1870), Samuel Keely House (c. 1870), Maria Wuensch Cottage (c. 1900), and Holy Rosary Catholic Church (1911-1925).

It was listed on the National Register of Historic Places in 1986.

References

Historic districts on the National Register of Historic Places in Indiana
Italianate architecture in Indiana
Gothic Revival architecture in Indiana
Tudor Revival architecture in Indiana
Renaissance Revival architecture in Indiana
Historic districts in Indianapolis
National Register of Historic Places in Indianapolis